The 1920 Abertillery by-election was held on 21 December 1920.  The by-election was held due to the resignation of the incumbent Labour MP, William Brace.  It was won by the Labour candidate George Barker.

References

Abertillery by-election
1920s elections in Wales
Elections in Monmouthshire
Abertillery by-election
By-elections to the Parliament of the United Kingdom in Welsh constituencies
20th century in Monmouthshire
Abertillery by-election